Kent Andersson may refer to:

 Kent Andersson (playwright) (1933–2005), Swedish actor, theatre director and playwright
 Kent Andersson (motorcyclist) (1942–2006), Swedish motorcycle racer
 Kent-Erik Andersson (born 1951), Swedish hockey right winger
 Kent Andersson (footballer), Swedish footballer
 Kent Andersson (wrestler) (born 1959), Swedish Olympic wrestler